Carl Richard Hugo Ernst Zörner (18 June 1895 – 12 October 1941) was a German international footballer.

Personal life
Zörner was born on 18 June 1895 in Neunkirchen. He died serving on the Russian front as a Hauptmann (captain) in the German army in World War II at the age of 46.

References

1895 births
1941 deaths
Association football goalkeepers
German footballers
Germany international footballers
German Army personnel killed in World War II
German Army officers of World War II
Sportspeople from Neunkirchen, Saarland
Footballers from Saarland
Military personnel from Saarland